Intermodal railfreight in Great Britain is a way of transporting containers between ports, inland ports and terminals in England, Scotland and Wales, by using rail to do so. Initially started by British Rail in the 1960s, the use of containers that could be swapped between different modes of transport goes back to the days of the London, Midland & Scottish Railway.

The transport of containers from ship to rail is classified by the UK government as Lo-Lo traffic (lift-on, lift-off). Volumes of intermodal traffic in the United Kingdom have been rising since 1998, with an expectation of further growth in the years ahead; by 2017, railfreight was moving one in four of containers that entered the United Kingdom. However, the movement of containers through the Channel Tunnel has been labelled as disappointing, but this has suffered a myriad of problems such as migrant issues and safety problems. Since privatisation of the railways in the 1990s, the market has grown from one initial operator (Freightliner), to four main operators, DB Cargo, Direct Rail Services and GB Railfreight, although other entrants have tried to run intermodal trains.

Many of the older terminals opened by British Rail have closed down, with the focus on strategic rail freight interchanges (SRFIs), which will focus on a wider area or region with good onward road, or water, transport links.

History

As a transfer container service, Freightliner was set up by British Rail as a separate company, with the first train running in November 1965. It was one of the reformative ideas put forward under the aegis of Richard Beeching as part of the rationalisation of the railway network in the 1960s. The idea of trains moving containers pre-dated the Beeching cuts, with some suggestions being put forward in the 1950s when the railway was under the control of the British Transport Commission. In the 1950s, British Rail ran a Condor service (an Anglo-Scottish container train that ran on two axle-wagons). The first service of Condor containers ran in March 1959, consisting of roller-bearing flat wagons that containers could be moved on and off with ease.

Even further back, the swapping of containers between modes of transport was utilised in the 19th century, when wooden containers were used, but after the railways were grouped in 1921, the London Midland & Scottish Railway (LMS) introduced this type of system with steel and aluminium containers.

Initially, the new Freightliner service was intended for the domestic movement of freight in containers between points in the Great Britain, with 16 terminals in operation in 1968, and Southampton and Tilbury under construction. However, in 1968 a London to Paris working was started which relied upon the Dover to Dunquerke train ferry, and by 1969, the service was linked into ports with a short-sea and a deep-sea service to other countries. In 1969, British Rail transferred ownership of Freightliner to the National Freight Corporation, but with BR supplying the wagons and locomotives. It was returned to BR in 1978.

By 1981, Freightliner was operating to 43 terminals, 25 of their own and 18 privately used locations. In 1982, the Port of Felixstowe was despatching three daily freight trains with containers on. In 1983, a second terminal opened (Felixstowe North), and between the two terminals, the amount of containers transhipped to and from rail was about 80,000 per year (20%). When a third terminal was opened in 2013 (named Felixstowe North, with the previous one being renamed Felixstowe Central), over 40 million TEUs (twenty-foot equivalent units) with 36 daily departures carrying containers were being handled. In 1986 and 1987, several terminals were closed, including four in Scotland (Aberdeen, Clydeport [Greenock], Dundee and Edinburgh) despite the potential for long-distance services from these terminals. British Rail deemed it more efficient to load containers at Coatbridge in Glasgow, and use electric traction south on the West Coast Main Line. Before the closures, Freightliner operated 35 terminals, including ports, compared with 19 under privatisation.

In 1988, Freightliner, Speedlink and Railfreight International, were amalgamated into one entity by British Rail, called Railfreight Distribution. A large section of the business that these three separate arms dealt with, were loss-making and the combined efforts were a way in which it was hoped to turn the businesses around. In 1992, it was assessed that Freightliner was making a 50% loss on its £70 million turnover, and the business was only serving nine locations. One of the problems causing this was that the deep-sea nature of the traffic carried was increasingly geared up to using the  containers, which required gauge enhancement or specially adapted wagons to be carried on the British railway system.

The advent of the Channel Tunnel opening, led to a resurgence in container traffic terminals being opened. These were separated into sites away from the main railfreight business as operated between UK terminals and deep-sea ports such as Southampton and Felixstowe. New European freight terminals were built at Trafford Park in Manchester, Wakefield in West Yorkshire and Willesden in North West London. After this, the intermodal services in Britain could be subdivided into three streams; traffic to and from ports, Channel Tunnel traffic and domestic flows, of which much Anglo-Scottish traffic falls into the latter. This is a complete modal shift of the domestic nature of the Freightliner network as instigated in the mid 1960s which initially envisaged the market being domestic traffic dominating. One suggestion for the change in traffic origin has been that containers entering ports have a lower transport cost, as they only need onward road transport to their final destination, as opposed to the domestic traffic which needs to be road-hauled, railed and then road-hauled again.

The opening of Daventry International Rail Freight Terminal (DIRFT) in July 1997, heralded another new venture into the intermodal business. The site is located on the Northampton Loop of the West Coast Main Line, and close to the M1 motorway and the A45 road. The land had been designated as a "motorway orientated growth point" in 1978, and so was ideally situated for this type of interchange and delivery point for intermodal traffic. In 1997, services through the Channel Tunnel operated between Birmingham Landor Street, Daventry, Mossend, Seaforth, Trafford Park, Wakefield and Willesden in the United Kingdom, with terminals in Europe (Avignon, Barcelona, Lyon, Melzo, Metz, Muizen, Novara, Oleggio, Paris, Perpignan, Rogoredo and Turin). Even so, the volumes of intermodal traffic (and other commodities) shifted by railfreight through the channel Tunnel have been low compared with forecasted freight volumes. Whilst some problems range from the physical; migrants using the services to cross and at one point, invading the railway yard at Frethun, other problems have been strikes by French workers and fires in the tunnel which hampered pathing trains through.

Binliners and other traffic
Binliners are so named because they carry waste traffic in containers on the same type of wagons used to carry (freight)liner trains, (binliner being a portmanteau of the words bin and liner, so it sounds like a binliner).

The carrying of waste on the railway network, used to involve slow moving wagons, but in the 1970s, terminals began opening which would take compacted waste in containers direct to a landfill site. Whilst this traffic is not routinely grouped under the intermodal umbrella, its use of containers makes it an intermodal railfreight service, even if no onward road transport was used at the destination. Most binliners would run as  block trains, but occasional special traffics would be railed to its final destination via the wagonload network, such as spent shot blast from Falmouth to Brindle Heath in Greater Manchester.

Most destinations were former quarrying or mining operations that had applications to take landfill. The main sites were at Forders in Bedfordshire, Calvert in Buckinghamshire, Appleford in Oxfordshire, Roxby Gullet in Lincolnshire and Appley Bridge in Greater Manchester. The main authorities using these sites were Greater London for Forders and Calvert, Avon for Calvert and Appleford, with Greater Manchester utilising first Appley Bridge, then Roxby when Appley Bridge was full. A similar operation was used on the Powderhall Branch in Edinburgh, which used to take compacted waste to exhausted quarry workings at the cement works at Oxwellmains in the Scottish Borders.

As an adaptation of the binliner trains, a landfill tax introduced in the 2010s, prompted some authorities to send their waste to be burnt in an energy from waste plant (EfW). Merseyside waste is burnt at the Wilton EfW plant, and some waste from London (loaded at Brentford) is burnt at the Severnside EfW plant.

Other commodities have been sent via containers such as desulphogypsum from power stations to gypsum processing plants, however, the containers are used solely for this purpose and not used as a generic swap container service available for different goods. Containers are used on the desulphogypsum traffic as it is sticky, so the use of hopper wagons would not work, and the use of tippler wagons would have been more expensive.

Rail versus other modes
In many areas of freight transport, rail loses out to road (or water transport), typically in smaller consists which has led to the demise of the wagonload network in Great Britain due to the small tonnages involved. Many containers are transferred between ports in Britain by water transport, mostly at sea using coastal shipping, but some on the canal or river systems. In 2018, the movement of Ro-Ro shipping traffic (which accounts for containers transported by sea, instead of the sea to land designation, which is Lo-Lo), equated to 3.3 billion tonne kilometres, in and around the United Kingdom. Even so, one of four containers that enter the United Kingdom, are then transported/part transported onwards by the use of railfreight.

Where rail transport has been beneficial, it has been over long distances such as Felixstowe to Coatbridge (Glasgow). Short distance flows are deemed uneconomic unless they can either be back filled, or be given a guaranteed full load on each train. An example of this was the Wilton to Doncaster Railport service in the 1990s/early 2000s, which carried containerised chemicals a distance of just . A similar service operates between Tees Dock and Doncaster iPort, which has an out and back run of only , and as such, the train and locomotive can be utilised twice in one day, making greater use of the resources. A service between Grangemouth on the Firth of Forth, and Elderslie in Renfrewshire, travelled a distance of only  in the one direction. Whilst it normally loaded to 100% going eastbound (from Elderslie), it was only very lightly loaded westbound (from Grangemouth). However, its ability to deliver containers the short distance and avoid the congested M8, M80, M876 and M9 motorways, meant that it afforded customers a better transit time. The wagons and locomotive were used on additional freight services in between its intermodal run.

The movement of railfreight is measured in net tonne kilometres (NTK). The figures for intermodal railfreight between 1998 and 2018 are given below. Between 1975 and 1995, the NTK for intermodal traffic steadily decreased from 3.1 billion to 2.3 billion. Post 1996 (privatisation of the railfreight companies), this has seen a steady rise.

Operational enhancements
Constraints on the movement of containers across the UK rail network have been the loading gauge of the railway lines themselves, with most lines being able to accommodate  containers. Only a few lines can handle the larger  containers which has led to some lines being adapted to accept the larger gauge, while other routes have used 'pocket' wagons, where the container sits lower down in the wagon. Due to the steady year-on-year increase of intermodal traffic volumes, Network Rail, the owner and infrastructure manager of the UK rail network, has undertaken a series of schemes to allow easier pathing and the removal of gauge restrictions on core routes across the network.

Additionally, due to the increase in billion tonne kilometres travelled, and intermodal slowly gaining a larger market share of railfreight tonnage moved, there have been several key network enhancement operations to enable smoother running of intermodal trains. Outside of the development of STRI's and general improvements in terminals and ports, the key programmes are listed below.

2000 (onwards) - Felixstowe branch line - a programme of engineering works to improve pathing availability on what was largely a single-track branch line in the early days of privatisation.
2004 - Ipswich tunnel enhancement - work to lower the floor of the tunnel, thus allowing  containers to be carried through the tunnel. This was part of a wider £30 million Strategic Rail Authority programme to enhance the gauge between Felixstowe and Birmingham via London.
2010–2011 - Gauge enhancement on the route between Southampton and the West Midlands.
The new chord allows northbound trains to access the down line without conflicting movements of other trains on the busy West Coast Main Line.
2014 - Ipswich Chord - a  new chord going from east to north allowing trains to access the Peterborough line from the Port of Felixstowe (and vice versa) without having to reverse in Ipswich yard.

Network Rail have other schemes in the proposal category that can affect intermodal traffic. One of these is known as the Castlefield corridor, a section of track between Castlefield Junction in West Manchester, and Manchester Picadilly railway station. After the Ordsall Chord opened in West Manchester, more trains were diverted to go through this bottleneck causing delays and cancellations, with Network Rail going so far as to label the  stretch of line as "congested infrastructure".

Some suggestions have been to have a west facing connection to the intermodal terminals so that they can access the West Coast Main Line via a new curve in the Warrington area. Another proposal, put forward by Railfuture, is to relocate the Manchester intermodal terminals on the old Carrington Branch, and therefore freeing up paths through Castlefield for passenger trains, or to add flex to the operational capacity of the corridor.

Open terminals

Mothballed/unused terminals 
The following are either not in use as intermodal terminals at present, but remain connected to the national network. Most will still be in use for rail business, but not handling containers.

Closed terminals
This section relates to former terminals which had dedicated services, and infrastructure such as gantry cranes, which have now closed. It does not include such terminals such as those at ports which operated a service previously. For example, in the early part of the 2000s, containers of car parts were transferred from Avonmouth to Tyne Dock for Nissan. Both these freight terminals still operate, but not necessarily in an intermodal capacity.

Future and proposed sites

There are proposals to also open SRFIs (Strategic Rail Freight Interchanges) at Skypark in Devon, Parkside in Lancashire, Etwall in Derbyshire, Burbage, Peterborough and SIFE (Slough International Freight Exchange) with a connection on the Colnbrook branch.

Operators

Intermodal trains were operated by British Rail from its inception until Privatisation in 1996. Immediately after Privatisation, the main company providing intermodal services was Freightliner, though EWS carried containers on their Enterprise wagonload service, and had started an initial service between Harwich and Doncaster to rival services run by Freightliner from Felixstowe. Later, other operators took on their own services, oftentimes running to their own unique locations, though with the gradual increase in Strategic Railfreight Interchanges (SFRI), many operators would rail containers to the same destinations from the same point of origin.

DIRFT, which opened in 1997, had ten departures daily operated by Freightliner, DB Cargo (previously EWS), and Direct Rail Services. Five of those trains went to Scotland going to their own loading points for each company; typically Coatbridge for Freightliner, Mossend for DB Cargo and either Mossend, Elderslie or Grangemouth for DRS.

Advenza Freight; 2004–2009
British Rail 1967–1997
Direct Rail Services 2001–present
DB Cargo 1996–present
Fastline Freight 2006–2010
Freightliner 1995–present
GB Railfreight 2002–present

See also
Rail freight in Great Britain

Notes

References

Sources

External links

British Rail freight services
Freight transport